Aeolian is the third album by the German metal band The Ocean. It was released on 7 March 2006 through Metal Blade Records.

About
Aeolian is the second part of a two-CD project that started with Fluxion. Whereas Fluxion had a focus on atmosphere and orchestral sounds, Aeolian focuses more on the band's hardcore and metal influences. The two albums were originally intended to be released together as a double CD, but this was cancelled due to financial reasons.

An animated music video was created for the song "One with the Ocean".

Track listing

Personnel
The Ocean
 Torge Ließmann – drums
 Gerd Kornmann – percussion
 Robin Staps – guitar, percussion
 Jonathan Heine – bass
 Meta – lead vocals
 Nico Webers – vocals
Additional musicians
 Carsten Albrecht – guest vocals
 Tomas Hallbom – guest vocals
 Sean Ingram – guest vocals
 Ercüment Kasalar – guest vocals
 Nate Newton – guest vocals
 Yuki Ryang - guest cello

References

2006 albums
The Ocean (band) albums